Atlantic Beach is a town in Horry County, South Carolina, United States, part of the Grand Strand tourist region. The population was 334 at the 2010 census. Most of the land around the town is annexed into the city of North Myrtle Beach.

History
Atlantic Beach is commonly nicknamed "The Black Pearl"; the rich culture of the town of Atlantic Beach was formed of mostly Gullah people, descendants of slaves who lived for 300 years on the Sea Islands from Wilmington, North Carolina to Jacksonville, Florida. In the early 1930s, defying Jim Crow laws in the segregated South, debunking black stereotypes, and broadening the enterprises of the Gullah people, black men and women opened hotels, restaurants, night clubs, and novelty shops in Atlantic Beach. Visitors would travel along Interstate 95, US 17 and SC 9, coming from nearby southern states, where racial segregation took its toll.

In October of 2022, a serving city councilman, James Dewitt II, and his wife were allegedly shot to death by a family member. The suspect, Matthew Dewitt, was taken into custody by the Richland County Sheriff's Office.

Geography

Demographics

2020 census

As of the 2020 United States census, there were 195 people, 87 households, and 39 families residing in the town.

2000 census
At the 2000 census there were 351 people, 132 households, and 83 families in the town. The population density was 2,214.5 people per square mile (847.0/km2). There were 244 housing units at an average density of 1,539.4 per square mile (588.8/km2).  The racial makeup of the town was 9.69% White, 82.05% African American, 7.12% from other races, and 1.14% from two or more races. Hispanic or Latino of any race were 9.97%.

Of the 132 households 39.4% had children under the age of 18 living with them, 18.9% were married couples living together, 37.1% had a female householder with no husband present, and 36.4% were non-families. 29.5% of households were one person and 6.8% were one person aged 65 or older. The average household size was 2.66 and the average family size was 3.17.

The age distribution was 29.6% under the age of 18, 9.7% from 18 to 24, 36.2% from 25 to 44, 15.1% from 45 to 64, and 9.4% 65 or older. The median age was 30 years. For every 100 females, there were 98.3 males. For every 100 females age 18 and over, there were 93.0 males.

The median household income was $24,375 and the median family income  was $20,313. Males had a median income of $16,477 versus $17,000 for females. The per capita income for the town was $12,492. About 31.3% of families and 27.6% of the population were below the poverty line, including 37.0% of those under age 18 and 27.6% of those age 65 or over.

References

External links

Towns in Horry County, South Carolina
Towns in South Carolina
Populated places in South Carolina established by African Americans